The Gabala FC 2009-10 season was Gabala's fourth Azerbaijan Premier League season, and their fourth season under manager Ramiz Mammadov. They finished the season in sixth place and were knocked out of the Azerbaijan Cup at the last 16 stage by Olimpik-Shuvalan. Their kit was supplied by Erreà and their main sponsor was Hyundai.

Squad

(captain)

Transfers

Summer

In:

 
 

 

 

Out:

Winter

In:

 
 
 
 

Out:

Competitions

Azerbaijan Premier League

Results

Table

Azerbaijan Premier League Championship Group

Results

Table

Azerbaijan Cup

Squad statistics

Appearances and goals

 

|-
|colspan="14"|Players who appeared for Gabala who left during the season:

|}

Goal scorers

Disciplinary record

References
Qarabağ have played their home games at the Tofiq Bahramov Stadium since 1993 due to the ongoing situation in Quzanlı.

External links 
Gabala FC Website
Gabala FC at UEFA.com

Gabala FC seasons
Gabala